The 2011 Hertsmere Borough Council election took place on 5 May 2011 to elect members of Hertsmere Borough Council in Hertfordshire, England. One third of the council was up for election and the Conservative Party stayed in overall control of the council.

After the election, the composition of the council was:
Conservative 35
Labour 4

Background
13 of the 39 seats on the council were being contested, with 2 sitting councillors standing down at the election, Conservative Darren Solomons and Liberal Democrat Anita Gamble. Meanwhile, the Liberal Democrat leader on the council Roger Kutchinsky contested Bushey Heath, instead of the ward he had previously held Bushey North.

Election result
The Conservatives gained 2 seats from the Liberal Democrats, but lost a seat to Labour, thus winning 11 of the 13 seats contested. This meant the Conservatives stayed in control of the council with 35 seats compared to 4 for Labour. Meanwhile, the defeats for the Liberal Democrats meant they no longer had any seats on Hertsmere council for the first time ever. Overall turnout at the election was 40.49%.

The Conservatives gained Bushey North and Bushey St James from the Liberal Democrats, while the Liberal Democrat leader came third in Bushey Heath. Labour candidate Richard Butler gained Borehamwood Kenilworth from the Conservatives, at the same election that his father Ernie Butler held Borehamwood Cowley Hill for Labour. The gain by 25-year-old Richard Butler meant Labour finished the election with more councillors than before the election for the first time since 1996.

Ward results

References

2011 English local elections
2011
2010s in Hertfordshire